Yahoo! Search is a Yahoo! internet search provider that uses Microsoft's Bing search engine to power results, since 2009, apart from four years with Google until 2019.

Originally, "Yahoo! Search" referred to a Yahoo!-provided interface that sent queries to a searchable index of pages supplemented with its directory of websites. The results were presented to the user under the Yahoo! brand. Originally, none of the actual web crawling and data housing was done by Yahoo! itself. In 2001, the searchable index was powered by Inktomi and later by Google until 2004, when Yahoo! Search became independent. On July 29, 2009, Microsoft and Yahoo! announced a deal in which Bing would henceforth power Yahoo! Search.

As of July 2018, Microsoft Sites handled 24.2 percent of all search queries in the United States. During the same period of time, Oath (the then-owner of the Yahoo brand) had a search market share of 11.5 percent. Market leader Google generated 63.2 percent of all core search queries in the United States.

Yahoo! Search was criticized for favoring websites owned by Yahoo!'s then-parent company, Verizon Media, in its search results.

In September 2021, investment funds managed by the private equity firm Apollo Global Management acquired 90% of Yahoo.

Search technology acquisition 
The roots of Search date back to Yahoo! Directory, which was launched in 1994 by Jerry Yang and David Filo, then students at Stanford University. In 1995, they introduced a search engine function, called Yahoo! Search, that allowed users to search Yahoo! Directory. it was the first popular search engine on the Web, despite not being a true Web crawler search engine. They later licensed Web search engines from other companies. Seeking to provide its own Web search engine results, Yahoo! acquired their own Web search technology. In 2002, they bought Inktomi, a "behind the scenes" or OEM search engine provider, whose results are shown on other companies' websites and powered Yahoo! in its earlier days.

In 2003, they purchased Overture Services, Inc., which included their owned the AlltheWeb and AltaVista search engines. Initially, even though Yahoo! owned multiple search engines, they didn't use them on the main yahoo.com website, but kept using Google's search engine for its results.

Starting on April 7, 2003, Yahoo! Search became its own web crawler-based search engine. They combined the capabilities of search engine companies they had acquired and their prior research into a reinvented crawler called Yahoo!. The new search engine results were included in all of Yahoo's websites that had a web search function. Yahoo! also started to sell the search engine results to other companies, to show on their own websites. Their relationship with Google was terminated at that time, with the former partners becoming each other's main competitors.

In October 2007, Yahoo! Search was updated with a more modern appearance in line with the redesigned Yahoo! home page. In addition, Search Assist was added; which provides real-time query suggestions and related concepts as they are typed.

In July 2008, Yahoo! Search announced the introduction of a new service called  Yahoo! Search BOSS ("Build your Own Search Engine"). This service opens the doors for developers to use Yahoo!'s system for indexing information and images and create their own custom search engine.

In January 2010, Microsoft announced a deal in which it would take over the functional operation of Yahoo! Search, and set up a joint venture to sell advertising on both Yahoo! Search and Bing known as the Microsoft Search Alliance. A complete transition of all Yahoo! sponsored ad clients to Microsoft adCenter (now Bing Ads) occurred in October 2010.

On March 12, 2014, Yahoo! announced a partnership with Yelp to integrate its reviews and user-contributed photos into Yahoo! Search (as Bing had previously done).

In November 2014, Mozilla signed a five-year partnership with Yahoo, making Yahoo Search the default search engine for Firefox browsers in the US.

In April 2015, the Microsoft partnership was modified, now only requiring Bing results on the "majority" of desktop traffic, opening the ability for Yahoo to enter into non-exclusive deals for search services on mobile platforms and the remainder of desktop traffic. The amendment also gives either company the ability to terminate the contract with four months' notice.  In October 2015, Yahoo subsequently reached an agreement with Google to provide services to Yahoo Search through the end of 2018, including advertising, search, and image search services. As of October 2019, Yahoo! Search is once again powered by Bing.

International presence 
Yahoo! Search also provided their search interface in at least 38 international markets and a variety of available languages. Yahoo! has a presence in Europe, Asia and across the Emerging Markets.

Languages

 Arabic
 Bulgarian
 Catalan
 Chinese (Simplified)
 Chinese (Traditional)
 Croatian
 Czech
 Danish
 Dutch
 English
 Estonian
 Finnish
 French
 German
 Greek
 Hebrew
 Hungarian
 Icelandic
 Indonesian
 Italian
 Japanese
 Korean
 Latvian
 Lithuanian
 Malay
 Norwegian
 Persian
 Polish
 Portuguese
 Romanian
 Russian
 Serbian
 Slovak
 Slovenian
 Spanish
 Swedish
 Tagalog
 Thai
 Turkish
 Vietnamese

Yahoo Image Search Results Languages
Yahoo Image Search Results in 24 languages
English
Spanish
Turkish
Tagalog
Arabic
Swedish
Vietnamese
Malay
Chinese, Traditional Chinese and Simplified Chinese
Other languages

Search results 
Yahoo Search indexed and cached the common HTML page formats, as well as several of the more popular file-types, such as PDF, Excel spreadsheets, PowerPoint presentations, Word documents, RSS/XML and plain text files. For some of these supported file-types, Yahoo! Search provided cached links on their search results allowing for viewing of these file-types in standard HTML. Using the Advanced Search interface or Preferences settings, Yahoo Search allowed the customization of search results and enabling of certain settings such as: SafeSearch, Language Selection, Number of results, Domain restrictions, etc. For a Basic and starter guide to Yahoo Search, they also provided a Search Basics tutorial. In 2005, Yahoo began to provide links to previous versions of pages archived on the Wayback Machine. In the first week of May 2008, Yahoo launched a new search paradigm called Yahoo Glue.

Selection-based search 
On June 20, 2007, Yahoo introduced a selection-based search feature called Yahoo Shortcuts. When activated this selection-based search feature enabled users to invoke search using only their mouse and receive search suggestions in floating windows while remaining on Yahoo properties such as Yahoo Mail.  This feature was only active on Yahoo web pages or pages within the Yahoo Publisher Network.  Yahoo Shortcuts required the content-owner to modify the underlying HTML of his or her webpage to call out the specific keywords to be enhanced.  The technology for context-aware selection-based search on Yahoo pages was first developed by Reiner Kraft.

SearchScan 

On May 11, 2008, Yahoo introduced SearchScan. If enabled this add-on/feature enhanced Yahoo Search by automatically alerting users of viruses, spyware and spam websites.

Search verticals
Yahoo Search provided the ability to search across numerous vertical properties outside just the Web at large. These included Images, Videos, Local, Shopping, Yahoo! Answers, Audio, Directory, Jobs, News, Mobile, Travel and various other services as listed on their About Yahoo Search page.

See also 
 Comparison of web search engines
 List of search engines
 Yahoo! Directory
 List of Yahoo!-owned sites and services
 Yahoo! Search BOSS
 Yahoo! SearchMonkey

References

External links 
 

 
Search
Multilingual websites
Internet search engines
IOS software
Android (operating system) software
Internet properties established in 1995